

Offseason
 October 7, 1986: Tom Gorman was released by the Phillies.
 November 16, 1986: Rocky Childress was purchased from the Phillies by the Houston Astros.

Regular season
After getting off to a dismal 1–8 start, the season began to turn when Mike Schmidt hit his 500th career home run in Pittsburgh on April 18. Schmidt cracked the milestone long ball on a 3–0 count off the Pirates' Don Robinson with two men on base in the ninth inning, which rallied the club from a one-run deficit to an eventual 8–6 victory.

Schmidt slammed three home runs in an 11–6 victory over the Expos on June 14 in Montreal, eventually finishing the season with 35 and 530 career homers.

Phillies pitcher Kevin Gross was pitching against the Chicago Cubs on August 10, 1987. Gross was caught with sandpaper in his glove and suspended for 10 games.

After going as high as six games over .500 in late August, the team crashed to a 13–21 finish and tied for fourth place in the NL East with the Pirates.

Season standings

Record vs. opponents

Notable transactions
 April 2, 1987: Ronn Reynolds was traded by the Philadelphia Phillies to the Houston Astros for Jeff Calhoun.
 June 2, 1987: Jim Vatcher was drafted by the Phillies in the 20th round of the 1987 Major League Baseball draft.
 June 10, 1987: Mike Easler was traded by the Phillies to the New York Yankees for Keith Hughes and Shane Turner.
 June 24, 1987: Dan Schatzeder and cash were traded by the Phillies to the Minnesota Twins for Danny Clay and Tom Schwarz (minors).

1987 Game Log

|- style="background:#fbb"
| 1 || April 7 || @ Braves || 0–6 || Rick Mahler (1–0) || Shane Rawley (0–1) || None || 31,343 || 0–1
|- style="background:#fbb"
| 2 || April 9 || @ Braves || 7–8 (10) || Gene Garber (1–0) || Dan Schatzeder (0–1) || None || 8,907 || 0–2
|- style="background:#fbb"
| 3 || April 10 || Cubs || 3–4 || Ed Lynch (1–0) || Kevin Gross (0–1) || Dickie Noles (1) || 43,212 || 0–3
|- style="background:#fbb"
| 4 || April 11 || Cubs || 1–9 || Rick Sutcliffe (1–1) || Joe Cowley (0–1) || None || 21,581 || 0–4
|- style="background:#bfb"
| 5 || April 12 || Cubs || 9–8 (10) || Steve Bedrosian (1–0) || Lee Smith (0–1) || None || 23,769 || 1–4
|- style="background:#fbb"
| 6 || April 13 || Cubs || 2–5 || Jamie Moyer (1–0) || Don Carman (0–1) || Lee Smith (1) || 15,366 || 1–5
|- style="background:#fbb"
| 7 || April 14 || Mets || 5–7 || Ron Darling (1–0) || Steve Bedrosian (1–1) || Jesse Orosco (3) || 22,836 || 1–6
|- style="background:#fbb"
| 8 || April 15 || Mets || 1–4 || Sid Fernandez (2–0) || Kevin Gross (0–2) || Doug Sisk (2) || 21,995 || 1–7
|- style="background:#fbb"
| 9 || April 16 || Mets || 3–9 || Rick Aguilera (1–0) || Joe Cowley (0–2) || None || 16,350 || 1–8
|- style="background:#bfb"
| 10 || April 17 || @ Pirates || 6–2 (10) || Steve Bedrosian (2–1) || Barry Jones (0–1) || None || 10,105 || 2–8
|- style="background:#bfb"
| 11 || April 18 || @ Pirates || 8–6 || Kent Tekulve (1–0) || Don Robinson (2–1) || None || 19,361 || 3–8
|- style="background:#fbb"
| 12 || April 19 || @ Pirates || 2–5 || Doug Drabek (1–1) || Bruce Ruffin (0–1) || Don Robinson (2) || 7,962 || 3–9
|- style="background:#bfb"
| 13 || April 20 || @ Expos || 4–3 || Dan Schatzeder (1–1) || Jay Tibbs (1–2) || Kent Tekulve (1) || 50,482 || 4–9
|- style="background:#fbb"
| 14 || April 22 || @ Expos || 3–7 || Neal Heaton (2–1) || Joe Cowley (0–3) || None || 8,114 || 4–10
|- style="background:#fbb"
| 15 || April 23 || @ Expos || 5–6 || Randy St. Claire (1–0) || Mike Jackson (0–1) || Andy McGaffigan (2) || 5,632 || 4–11
|- style="background:#bbb"
| – || April 24 || Pirates || colspan=6 | Postponed (rain); Makeup: June 29 as a traditional double-header
|- style="background:#bfb"
| 16 || April 25 || Pirates || 3–2 || Don Carman (1–1) || Doug Drabek (1–2) || Kent Tekulve (2) || 18,553 || 5–11
|- style="background:#bfb"
| 17 || April 26 || Pirates || 6–4 || Bruce Ruffin (1–1) || Rick Reuschel (0–1) || Steve Bedrosian (1) || 30,234 || 6–11
|- style="background:#fbb"
| 18 || April 27 || Expos || 4–6 || Neal Heaton (3–1) || Kevin Gross (0–3) || Randy St. Claire (3) || 15,149 || 6–12
|- style="background:#fbb"
| 19 || April 28 || Expos || 1–7 || Floyd Youmans (1–2) || Joe Cowley (0–4) || Andy McGaffigan (3) || 11,598 || 6–13
|- style="background:#bfb"
| 20 || April 29 || Expos || 5–0 || Shane Rawley (1–1) || Bob Sebra (1–3) || None || 14,588 || 7–13
|-

|- style="background:#fbb"
| 21 || May 1 || Reds || 5–8 || Mario Soto (2–0) || Don Carman (1–2) || Ron Robinson (4) || 21,249 || 7–14
|- style="background:#bfb"
| 22 || May 2 || Reds || 8–3 || Bruce Ruffin (2–1) || Tom Browning (2–4) || None || 32,103 || 8–14
|- style="background:#fbb"
| 23 || May 3 || Reds || 6–9 || Bill Gullickson (4–1) || Kevin Gross (0–4) || John Franco (4) || 33,062 || 8–15
|- style="background:#fbb"
| 24 || May 5 || Astros || 1–5 || Danny Darwin (2–1) || Shane Rawley (1–2) || None || 15,611 || 8–16
|- style="background:#fbb"
| 25 || May 6 || Astros || 2–3 || Larry Andersen (3–1) || Kent Tekulve (1–1) || Dave Smith (6) || 15,809 || 8–17
|- style="background:#fbb"
| 26 || May 8 || @ Reds || 3–4 || Tom Browning (3–4) || Bruce Ruffin (2–2) || John Franco (6) || 37,176 || 8–18
|- style="background:#bfb"
| 27 || May 9 || @ Reds || 4–2 || Kevin Gross (1–4) || Bill Gullickson (4–2) || None || 36,910 || 9–18
|- style="background:#bfb"
| 28 || May 10 || @ Reds || 4–3 || Shane Rawley (2–2) || Ted Power (3–1) || Steve Bedrosian (2) || 29,867 || 10–18
|- style="background:#bfb"
| 29 || May 11 || @ Astros || 7–6 || Dan Schatzeder (2–1) || Larry Andersen (3–2) || Steve Bedrosian (3) || 11,369 || 11–18
|- style="background:#fbb"
| 30 || May 12 || @ Astros || 2–5 || Bob Knepper (2–2) || Mike Jackson (0–2) || Aurelio López (1) || 8,950 || 11–19
|- style="background:#fbb"
| 31 || May 13 || Braves || 5–10 || David Palmer (3–4) || Bruce Ruffin (2–3) || Jim Acker (3) || 16,142 || 11–20
|- style="background:#bfb"
| 32 || May 14 || Braves || 5–4 || Kevin Gross (2–4) || Rick Mahler (2–5) || Steve Bedrosian (4) || 17,705 || 12–20
|- style="background:#bfb"
| 33 || May 15 || Padres || 7–4 || Shane Rawley (3–2) || Ed Whitson (4–5) || Steve Bedrosian (5) || 22,907 || 13–20
|- style="background:#bfb"
| 34 || May 16 || Padres || 9–0 || Don Carman (2–2) || Jimmy Jones (0–1) || None || 21,713 || 14–20
|- style="background:#fbb"
| 35 || May 17 || Padres || 5–6 || Andy Hawkins (1–5) || Mike Jackson (0–3) || Lance McCullers (4) || 34,964 || 14–21
|- style="background:#bfb"
| 36 || May 18 || Dodgers || 5–3 || Bruce Ruffin (3–3) || Rick Honeycutt (2–2) || Steve Bedrosian (6) || 17,314 || 15–21
|- style="background:#bbb"
| – || May 19 || Dodgers || colspan=6 | Postponed (rain); Makeup: August 21 as a traditional double-header
|- style="background:#bfb"
| 37 || May 21 || Dodgers || 6–3 || Shane Rawley (4–2) || Alejandro Peña (0–4) || Steve Bedrosian (7) || 13,639 || 16–21
|- style="background:#fbb"
| 38 || May 22 || Giants || 1–2 || Atlee Hammaker (2–1) || Don Carman (2–3) || Scott Garrelts (6) || 18,744 || 16–22
|- style="background:#bfb"
| 39 || May 23 || Giants || 9–8 || Steve Bedrosian (3–1) || Jeff Robinson (3–2) || None || 21,841 || 17–22
|- style="background:#fbb"
| 40 || May 24 || Giants || 3–6 || Mike LaCoss (5–1) || Kent Tekulve (1–2) || Jeff Robinson (7) || 28,541 || 17–23
|- style="background:#bfb"
| 41 || May 25 || @ Padres || 6–4 || Dan Schatzeder (3–1) || Dave Dravecky (1–5) || Steve Bedrosian (8) || 11,504 || 18–23
|- style="background:#bfb"
| 42 || May 26 || @ Padres || 3–1 || Shane Rawley (5–2) || Jimmy Jones (0–2) || Steve Bedrosian (9) || 9,347 || 19–23
|- style="background:#bfb"
| 43 || May 27 || @ Padres || 6–4 || Don Carman (3–3) || Andy Hawkins (2–6) || Steve Bedrosian (10) || 8,164 || 20–23
|- style="background:#fbb"
| 44 || May 29 || @ Dodgers || 0–6 || Bob Welch (6–2) || Bruce Ruffin (3–4) || None || 36,036 || 20–24
|- style="background:#bfb"
| 45 || May 30 || @ Dodgers || 3–0 || Kevin Gross (3–4) || Orel Hershiser (4–6) || None || 30,216 || 21–24
|- style="background:#bfb"
| 46 || May 31 || @ Dodgers || 3–1 || Shane Rawley (6–2) || Rick Honeycutt (2–4) || Steve Bedrosian (11) || 39,204 || 22–24
|-

|- style="background:#fbb"
| 47 || June 1 || @ Giants || 2–9 || Atlee Hammaker (3–1) || Don Carman (3–4) || None || 6,655 || 22–25
|- style="background:#bfb"
| 48 || June 2 || @ Giants || 7–6 || Wally Ritchie (1–0) || Mark Davis (3–4) || Steve Bedrosian (12) || 10,826 || 23–25
|- style="background:#fbb"
| 49 || June 3 || @ Giants || 1–4 || Mike LaCoss (6–2) || Bruce Ruffin (3–5) || Jeff Robinson (8) || 10,522 || 23–26
|- style="background:#bfb"
| 50 || June 5 || Expos || 7–6 || Kevin Gross (4–4) || Andy McGaffigan (0–1) || Steve Bedrosian (13) || 26,508 || 24–26
|- style="background:#bfb"
| 51 || June 6 || Expos || 4–3 || Shane Rawley (7–2) || Bob Sebra (3–6) || None || 30,177 || 25–26
|- style="background:#bfb"
| 52 || June 7 || Expos || 3–1 || Mike Jackson (1–3) || Bryn Smith (3–2) || Steve Bedrosian (14) || 43,298 || 26–26
|- style="background:#fbb"
| 53 || June 8 || Cardinals || 8–12 || Ricky Horton (3–0) || Don Carman (3–5) || None || 23,422 || 26–27
|- style="background:#bfb"
| 54 || June 9 || Cardinals || 3–2 || Bruce Ruffin (4–5) || Danny Cox (6–3) || Steve Bedrosian (15) || 22,009 || 27–27
|- style="background:#fbb"
| 55 || June 10 || Cardinals || 1–3 || Greg Mathews (4–4) || Kevin Gross (4–5) || Todd Worrell (14) || 27,976 || 27–28
|- style="background:#fbb"
| 56 || June 12 || @ Expos || 6–13 || Bryn Smith (4–2) || Shane Rawley (7–3) || None || 20,031 || 27–29
|- style="background:#fbb"
| 57 || June 13 || @ Expos || 5–7 || Neal Heaton (9–2) || Mike Jackson (1–4) || Tim Burke (7) || 24,221 || 27–30
|- style="background:#bfb"
| 58 || June 14 || @ Expos || 11–6 || Don Carman (4–5) || Lary Sorensen (3–3) || None || 30,209 || 28–30
|- style="background:#bfb"
| 59 || June 15 || @ Cubs || 3–2 || Kent Tekulve (2–2) || Lee Smith (2–4) || Steve Bedrosian (16) || 18,643 || 29–30
|- style="background:#fbb"
| 60 || June 16 || @ Cubs || 2–7 || Steve Trout (3–1) || Kevin Gross (4–6) || Lee Smith (16) || 30,007 || 29–31
|- style="background:#fbb"
| 61 || June 17 || @ Cubs || 3–5 || Jamie Moyer (7–4) || Shane Rawley (7–4) || Lee Smith (17) || 26,447 || 29–32
|- style="background:#fbb"
| 62 || June 18 || @ Cubs || 7–9 || Rick Sutcliffe (9–3) || Mike Jackson (1–5) || Lee Smith (18) || 22,870 || 29–33
|- style="background:#fbb"
| 63 || June 19 || @ Mets || 1–8 || John Mitchell (1–1) || Don Carman (4–6) || None || 46,824 || 29–34
|- style="background:#fbb"
| 64 || June 20 || @ Mets || 2–3 || Dwight Gooden (3–1) || Kent Tekulve (2–3) || None || 49,043 || 29–35
|- style="background:#fbb"
| 65 || June 21 || @ Mets || 3–8 || Sid Fernandez (9–3) || Kevin Gross (4–7) || Roger McDowell (8) || 44,838 || 29–36
|- style="background:#bfb"
| 66 || June 23 || @ Cardinals || 4–1 || Shane Rawley (8–4) || Lee Tunnell (3–2) || Steve Bedrosian (17) || 30,455 || 30–36
|- style="background:#fbb"
| 67 || June 24 || @ Cardinals || 3–5 || Todd Worrell (2–3) || Mike Jackson (1–6) || None || 29,328 || 30–37
|- style="background:#fbb"
| 68 || June 25 || @ Cardinals || 0–3 || Greg Mathews (5–5) || Bruce Ruffin (4–6) || None || 38,357 || 30–38
|- style="background:#bfb"
| 69 || June 26 || Mets || 5–2 || Kevin Gross (5–7) || Sid Fernandez (9–4) || Steve Bedrosian (18) || 36,263 || 31–38
|- style="background:#fbb"
| 70 || June 27 || Mets || 4–5 || Terry Leach (6–0) || Shane Rawley (8–5) || Roger McDowell (9) || 40,128 || 31–39
|- style="background:#bfb"
| 71 || June 28 || Mets || 5–4 || Doug Bair (1–0) || Roger McDowell (4–3) || None || 52,206 || 32–39
|- style="background:#bfb"
| 72 || June 29 (1) || Pirates || 6–5 || Mike Jackson (2–6) || Barry Jones (2–2) || Steve Bedrosian (19) || see 2nd game || 33–39
|- style="background:#bfb"
| 73 || June 29 (2) || Pirates || 11–3 || Doug Bair (2–0) || Mike Dunne (3–3) || Wally Ritchie (1) || 30,046 || 34–39
|- style="background:#bfb"
| 74 || June 30 || Pirates || 6–4 || Kevin Gross (6–7) || Doug Drabek (1–7) || Steve Bedrosian (20) || 20,598 || 35–39
|-

|- style="background:#bfb"
| 75 || July 1 || Pirates || 11–4 || Shane Rawley (9–5) || Dorn Taylor (2–3) || None || 19,977 || 36–39
|- style="background:#fbb"
| 76 || July 2 || Astros || 6–7 || Larry Andersen (6–4) || Steve Bedrosian (3–2) || Dave Smith (15) || 19,213 || 36–40
|- style="background:#bfb"
| 77 || July 3 || Astros || 2–1 || Bruce Ruffin (5–6) || Nolan Ryan (4–9) || Steve Bedrosian (21) || 56,825 || 37–40
|- style="background:#bfb"
| 78 || July 4 || Astros || 9–3 || Tom Hume (1–0) || Jim Deshaies (8–3) || Mike Jackson (1) || 20,178 || 38–40
|- style="background:#fbb"
| 79 || July 5 || Astros || 2–8 || Mike Scott (10–4) || Kevin Gross (6–8) || Larry Andersen (2) || 30,179 || 38–41
|- style="background:#bfb"
| 80 || July 6 || @ Reds || 9–6 || Mike Jackson (3–6) || Ted Power (6–4) || Steve Bedrosian (22) || 18,802 || 39–41
|- style="background:#bfb"
| 81 || July 7 || @ Reds || 10–8 (10) || Kent Tekulve (3–3) || John Franco (5–3) || Steve Bedrosian (23) || 22,553 || 40–41
|- style="background:#bfb"
| 82 || July 8 || @ Reds || 7–2 || Bruce Ruffin (6–6) || Guy Hoffman (7–3) || None || 26,082 || 41–41
|- style="background:#fbb"
| 83 || July 9 || @ Braves || 6–11 || Jeff Dedmon (3–3) || Tom Hume (1–1) || None || 10,671 || 41–42
|- style="background:#bfb"
| 84 || July 10 || @ Braves || 5–2 || Shane Rawley (10–5) || Doyle Alexander (4–5) || Steve Bedrosian (24) || 12,068 || 42–42
|- style="background:#fbb"
| 85 || July 11 || @ Braves || 4–5 || Rick Mahler (6–9) || Don Carman (4–7) || Jim Acker (7) || 30,503 || 42–43
|- style="background:#fbb"
| 86 || July 12 || @ Braves || 3–9 || Randy O'Neal (4–1) || Bruce Ruffin (6–7) || Paul Assenmacher (1) || 16,579 || 42–44
|- style="background:#bbcaff;"
| – || July 14 ||colspan="7" |1987 Major League Baseball All-Star Game at Oakland–Alameda County Coliseum in Oakland
|- style="background:#fbb"
| 87 || July 16 || @ Astros || 1–2 || Danny Darwin (6–6) || Mike Jackson (3–7) || None || 19,614 || 42–45
|- style="background:#bfb"
| 88 || July 17 || @ Astros || 2–1 || Shane Rawley (11–5) || Mike Scott (10–6) || Steve Bedrosian (25) || 32,608 || 43–45
|- style="background:#bfb"
| 89 || July 18 || @ Astros || 4–2 || Don Carman (5–7) || Bob Knepper (3–11) || Steve Bedrosian (26) || 30,368 || 44–45
|- style="background:#bfb"
| 90 || July 19 || @ Astros || 4–1 || Bruce Ruffin (7–7) || Nolan Ryan (4–11) || None || 25,143 || 45–45
|- style="background:#fbb"
| 91 || July 20 || Reds || 6–10 (11) || John Franco (6–3) || Mike Jackson (3–8) || None || 27,347 || 45–46
|- style="background:#fbb"
| 92 || July 21 || Reds || 3–4 || Bill Gullickson (10–6) || Kevin Gross (6–9) || Rob Murphy (2) || 27,184 || 45–47
|- style="background:#bfb"
| 93 || July 22 || Reds || 5–3 || Shane Rawley (12–5) || Tom Browning (5–8) || Steve Bedrosian (27) || 28,046 || 46–47
|- style="background:#bfb"
| 94 || July 23 || Braves || 5–1 || Don Carman (6–7) || Charlie Puleo (3–3) || None || 29,163 || 47–47
|- style="background:#bfb"
| 95 || July 24 || Braves || 11–5 || Bruce Ruffin (8–7) || Rick Mahler (6–10) || None || 26,307 || 48–47
|- style="background:#fbb"
| 96 || July 25 || Braves || 1–2 || David Palmer (5–8) || Tom Hume (1–2) || Gene Garber (9) || 32,077 || 48–48
|- style="background:#bfb"
| 97 || July 26 || Braves || 7–3 || Kent Tekulve (4–3) || Doyle Alexander (5–7) || None || 47,022 || 49–48
|- style="background:#bfb"
| 98 || July 28 || @ Pirates || 5–2 || Shane Rawley (13–5) || Rick Reuschel (8–5) || None || 16,270 || 50–48
|- style="background:#bfb"
| 99 || July 29 || @ Pirates || 4–3 || Don Carman (7–7) || Doug Drabek (2–10) || Steve Bedrosian (28) || 28,392 || 51–48
|- style="background:#bfb"
| 100 || July 30 || @ Pirates || 1–0 || Bruce Ruffin (9–7) || John Smiley (3–2) || Steve Bedrosian (29) || 11,769 || 52–48
|- style="background:#bfb"
| 101 || July 31 || @ Cubs || 8–5 || Kent Tekulve (5–3) || Scott Sanderson (4–6) || Steve Bedrosian (30) || 32,930 || 53–48
|-

|- style="background:#fbb"
| 102 || August 1 || @ Cubs || 3–5 || Les Lancaster (3–1) || Tom Hume (1–3) || Lee Smith (26) || 33,002 || 53–49
|- style="background:#fbb"
| 103 || August 2 || @ Cubs || 2–3 (10) || Lee Smith (3–6) || Jeff Calhoun (0–1) || None || 33,629 || 53–50
|- style="background:#fbb"
| 104 || August 3 || @ Mets || 2–3 (11) || Roger McDowell (6–3) || Kent Tekulve (5–4) || None || 50,297 || 53–51
|- style="background:#fbb"
| 105 || August 4 || @ Mets || 3–5 || Dwight Gooden (9–3) || Bruce Ruffin (9–8) || None || 38,252 || 53–52
|- style="background:#fbb"
| 106 || August 5 || @ Mets || 3–13 || John Mitchell (3–3) || Kevin Gross (6–10) || Randy Myers (2) || 28,178 || 53–53
|- style="background:#fbb"
| 107 || August 6 || Cardinals || 2–5 || John Tudor (3–1) || Tom Hume (1–4) || Todd Worrell (23) || 31,635 || 53–54
|- style="background:#bfb"
| 108 || August 7 || Cardinals || 15–5 || Shane Rawley (14–5) || Joe Magrane (6–3) || None || 31,247 || 54–54
|- style="background:#fbb"
| 109 || August 8 || Cardinals || 5–9 || Todd Worrell (6–6) || Don Carman (7–8) || None || 46,732 || 54–55
|- style="background:#bfb"
| 110 || August 9 || Cardinals || 8–7 (14) || Wally Ritchie (2–0) || Ricky Horton (6–2) || None || 37,158 || 55–55
|- style="background:#bfb"
| 111 || August 10 || Cubs || 4–2 || Todd Frohwirth (1–0) || Jamie Moyer (9–9) || Steve Bedrosian (31) || 26,796 || 56–55
|- style="background:#bfb"
| 112 || August 11 || Cubs || 9–8 (13) || Kevin Gross (7–10) || Bob Tewksbury (1–8) || None || 30,459 || 57–55
|- style="background:#bfb"
| 113 || August 12 || Cubs || 13–7 || Jeff Calhoun (1–1) || Ed Lynch (1–7) || None || 36,190 || 58–55
|- style="background:#bfb"
| 114 || August 13 || @ Cardinals || 4–2 (13) || Steve Bedrosian (4–2) || Ken Dayley (7–3) || Wally Ritchie (2) || 37,088 || 59–55
|- style="background:#fbb"
| 115 || August 14 || @ Cardinals || 4–8 || Greg Mathews (8–8) || Bruce Ruffin (9–9) || Todd Worrell (25) || 47,913 || 59–56
|- style="background:#bfb"
| 116 || August 15 || @ Cardinals || 5–2 || Kevin Gross (8–10) || Bob Forsch (10–4) || Steve Bedrosian (32) || 48,309 || 60–56
|- style="background:#bfb"
| 117 || August 16 || @ Cardinals || 4–3 || Shane Rawley (15–5) || John Tudor (3–2) || Steve Bedrosian (33) || 43,759 || 61–56
|- style="background:#fbb"
| 118 || August 18 || Padres || 4–9 (11) || Rich Gossage (4–3) || Wally Ritchie (2–1) || None || 27,867 || 61–57
|- style="background:#bfb"
| 119 || August 19 || Padres || 6–5 || Bruce Ruffin (10–9) || Mark Grant (3–7) || Jeff Calhoun (1) || 30,595 || 62–57
|- style="background:#bfb"
| 120 || August 20 || Padres || 10–2 || Freddie Toliver (1–0) || Eric Show (6–15) || Wally Ritchie (3) || 23,446 || 63–57
|- style="background:#bfb"
| 121 || August 21 (1) || Dodgers || 2–1 (11) || Kent Tekulve (6–4) || Matt Young (5–7) || None || see 2nd game || 64–57
|- style="background:#bfb"
| 122 || August 21 (2) || Dodgers || 7–3 || Shane Rawley (16–5) || Tim Leary (3–9) || None || 48,656 || 65–57
|- style="background:#bfb"
| 123 || August 22 || Dodgers || 2–0 || Mike Maddux (1–0) || Rick Honeycutt (2–12) || Kent Tekulve (3) || 27,160 || 66–57
|- style="background:#fbb"
| 124 || August 23 || Dodgers || 1–5 || Orel Hershiser (13–12) || Don Carman (7–9) || None || 36,407 || 66–58
|- style="background:#fbb"
| 125 || August 24 || Giants || 1–6 || Rick Reuschel (9–6) || Bruce Ruffin (10–10) || None || 30,237 || 66–59
|- style="background:#fbb"
| 126 || August 25 || Giants || 2–3 || Scott Garrelts (11–7) || Kevin Gross (8–11) || None || 28,841 || 66–60
|- style="background:#fbb"
| 127 || August 26 || Giants || 0–2 || Don Robinson (8–6) || Shane Rawley (16–6) || None || 23,776 || 66–61
|- style="background:#bfb"
| 128 || August 28 || @ Padres || 8–1 || Don Carman (8–9) || Ed Whitson (10–9) || None || 12,711 || 67–61
|- style="background:#fbb"
| 129 || August 29 || @ Padres || 1–3 || Eric Nolte (2–2) || Bruce Ruffin (10–11) || None || 12,492 || 67–62
|- style="background:#fbb"
| 130 || August 30 || @ Padres || 1–6 || Mark Grant (5–7) || Kevin Gross (8–12) || None || 12,072 || 67–63
|- style="background:#bfb"
| 131 || August 31 || @ Dodgers || 4–2 || Shane Rawley (17–6) || Bob Welch (11–9) || Steve Bedrosian (34) || 38,104 || 68–63
|-

|- style="background:#bfb"
| 132 || September 1 || @ Dodgers || 7–5 || Wally Ritchie (3–1) || Tim Leary (3–11) || Steve Bedrosian (35) || 23,074 || 69–63
|- style="background:#bfb"
| 133 || September 2 || @ Dodgers || 6–2 || Don Carman (9–9) || Orel Hershiser (13–13) || None || 19,958 || 70–63
|- style="background:#fbb"
| 134 || September 4 || @ Giants || 2–3 (10) || Don Robinson (9–6) || Wally Ritchie (3–2) || None || 16,644 || 70–64
|- style="background:#fbb"
| 135 || September 5 || @ Giants || 3–6 || Dave Dravecky (9–9) || Shane Rawley (17–7) || Kelly Downs (1) || 22,694 || 70–65
|- style="background:#fbb"
| 136 || September 6 || @ Giants || 1–4 || Rick Reuschel (11–7) || Freddie Toliver (1–1) || None || 40,768 || 70–66
|- style="background:#bfb"
| 137 || September 7 || @ Mets || 5–3 || Don Carman (10–9) || Dwight Gooden (13–5) || Steve Bedrosian (36) || 45,699 || 71–66
|- style="background:#fbb"
| 138 || September 8 || @ Mets || 2–5 || Terry Leach (11–1) || Bruce Ruffin (10–12) || Doug Sisk (3) || 17,518 || 71–67
|- style="background:#fbb"
| 139 || September 9 || @ Mets || 5–11 || Rick Aguilera (8–2) || Shane Rawley (17–8) || None || 30,362 || 71–68
|- style="background:#fbb"
| 140 || September 11 || Pirates || 2–4 || Doug Drabek (8–11) || Kevin Gross (8–13) || Jim Gott (10) || 20,085 || 71–69
|- style="background:#fbb"
| 141 || September 12 || Pirates || 4–12 || Mike Dunne (11–5) || Don Carman (10–10) || None || 15,440 || 71–70
|- style="background:#fbb"
| 142 || September 13 || Pirates || 1–6 || Brian Fisher (9–9) || Bruce Ruffin (10–13) || None || 12,610 || 71–71
|- style="background:#bfb"
| 143 || September 14 || Cardinals || 3–2 (11) || Jeff Calhoun (2–1) || Ken Dayley (9–5) || None || 20,749 || 72–71
|- style="background:#fbb"
| 144 || September 15 || Cardinals || 3–4 || Ricky Horton (7–3) || Kevin Gross (8–14) || Todd Worrell (29) || 20,697 || 72–72
|- style="background:#bfb"
| 145 || September 16 || Cubs || 8–5 || Mike Maddux (2–0) || Lee Smith (4–10) || Steve Bedrosian (37) || 17,598 || 73–72
|- style="background:#bfb"
| 146 || September 17 || Cubs || 4–3 || Don Carman (11–10) || Jamie Moyer (11–14) || Steve Bedrosian (38) || 10,338 || 74–72
|- style="background:#fbb"
| 147 || September 18 || @ Expos || 3–6 || Bryn Smith (10–7) || Bruce Ruffin (10–14) || None || 23,466 || 74–73
|- style="background:#fbb"
| 148 || September 19 || @ Expos || 4–12 || Dennis Martínez (10–3) || Shane Rawley (17–9) || Jeff Parrett (6) || 33,072 || 74–74
|- style="background:#bfb"
| 149 || September 20 || @ Expos || 4–1 || Kevin Gross (9–14) || Neal Heaton (12–9) || Steve Bedrosian (39) || 35,082 || 75–74
|- style="background:#fbb"
| 150 || September 21 || @ Cardinals || 1–3 || John Tudor (8–2) || Don Carman (11–11) || Todd Worrell (31) || 38,396 || 75–75
|- style="background:#fbb"
| 151 || September 22 || @ Cardinals || 2–3 || Danny Cox (10–8) || Shane Rawley (17–10) || Todd Worrell (32) || 42,725 || 75–76
|- style="background:#bfb"
| 152 || September 23 || @ Cubs || 5–0 || Bruce Ruffin (11–14) || Jamie Moyer (11–15) || None || 7,160 || 76–76
|- style="background:#bfb"
| 153 || September 24 || @ Cubs || 3–2 (11) || Steve Bedrosian (5–2) || Jay Baller (0–1) || None || 6,904 || 77–76
|- style="background:#bfb"
| 154 || September 25 || Expos || 4–2 || Don Carman (12–11) || Neal Heaton (12–10) || Steve Bedrosian (40) || 16,641 || 78–76
|- style="background:#fbb"
| 155 || September 26 || Expos || 4–7 || Pascual Pérez (6–0) || Shane Rawley (17–11) || Andy McGaffigan (11) || 27,453 || 78–77
|- style="background:#fbb"
| 156 || September 27 || Expos || 3–5 || Jeff Parrett (6–5) || Mike Jackson (3–9) || Tim Burke (16) || 33,662 || 78–78
|- style="background:#fbb"
| 157 || September 28 || Mets || 0–1 || John Candelaria (10–6) || Kevin Gross (9–15) || Randy Myers (6) || 26,440 || 78–79
|- style="background:#bfb"
| 158 || September 29 || Mets || 3–0 || Don Carman (13–11) || David Cone (5–6) || None || 30,799 || 79–79
|- style="background:#bfb"
| 159 || September 30 || Mets || 4–3 (10) || Jeff Calhoun (3–1) || Jesse Orosco (3–9) || None || 27,672 || 80–79
|-

|- style="background:#fbb"
| 160 || October 2 || @ Pirates || 4–6 || Bob Walk (8–2) || Mike Jackson (3–10) || Jim Gott (13) || 8,245 || 80–80
|- style="background:#fbb"
| 161 || October 3 || @ Pirates || 5–10 || Vicente Palacios (2–1) || Kevin Gross (9–16) || None || 12,790 || 80–81
|- style="background:#fbb"
| 162 || October 4 || @ Pirates || 2–4 || Mike Dunne (13–6) || Steve Bedrosian' (5–3) || Jeff Robinson (14) || 26,734 || 80–82
|-

Roster

Player stats

Batting

Starters by positionNote: Pos = Position; G = Games played; AB = At bats; H = Hits; Avg. = Batting average; HR = Home runs; RBI = Runs batted inOther battersNote: G = Games played; AB = At bats; H = Hits; Avg. = Batting average; HR = Home runs; RBI = Runs batted inPitching

Starting pitchersNote: G = Games pitched; IP = Innings pitched; W = Wins; L = Losses; ERA = Earned run average; SO = StrikeoutsOther pitchersNote: G = Games pitched; IP = Innings pitched; W = Wins; L = Losses; ERA = Earned run average; SO = StrikeoutsRelief pitchersNote: G = Games pitched; W = Wins; L = Losses; SV = Saves; ERA = Earned run average; SO = Strikeouts Farm system 

Notes

References
1987 Philadelphia Phillies season at Baseball Reference''

Philadelphia Phillies seasons
Philadelphia Phillies season
Philadelphia Phillies